Tai Long Wan is a bay at the south of the Chi Ma Wan Peninsula on Lantau Island, Hong Kong. It is the next bay east of Yi Long Wan, where the Sea Ranch is located.

Village
The village of Tai Long is located north of the bay. It is a recognized village under the New Territories Small House Policy.

References

External links
 Delineation of area of existing village Tai Long (South Lantao) for election of resident representative (2019 to 2022)

Bays of Hong Kong
Lantau Island
Villages in Islands District, Hong Kong